Manuel Bernardo Alvarado Green (15 March 1948 – 30 April 2010) was a Guatemalan-born British academic, who specialized in media studies. During his career he was secretary of the Society for Education in Film and Television and the editor of Screen Education. He also served as head of education at the British Film Institute and lectured at West Surrey College of Art and Design, Luton University, Sunderland University and City University.

Selected works
 Doctor Who: The Unfolding Text (1983)
 Made for Television: Euston Films Ltd (1985)
 East of Dallas: The European Challenge to American Television (1988)
 The Media Reader (1990)

References

1948 births
2010 deaths
British mass media scholars
Guatemalan academics
Guatemalan emigrants to England
People from Guatemala City
Academics of the University of Sunderland